Grace Etsuko Lee is an author and the president/founder of Grace Lee International.

As an Author
In 2010, her first published book, Little Caterpillar in Training: A Culture in Transition and Its Mixed Child in Post-war Japan, got the attention of the Japanese American National Museum. Grace is currently working with the museum to promote their National Diversity Education Program.

Lee has been quoted as saying "Americans are unique in the sense that they can pick the strengths and positive benefits from other cultures and incorporate them into their own society. This combining brings the best social graces from every culture to become the powerful American culture of the future."

References

External links
 
 Interview with Rhett Palmer
 Interview on Thrive America
 Little Caterpillar

Living people
Year of birth missing (living people)
American women writers
21st-century American women